Gregory Michael Hill (born February 12, 1961) is a former professional American football cornerback in the National Football League. He played six seasons for the Houston Oilers, the Kansas City Chiefs, and the Los Angeles Raiders.

1961 births
Living people
People from Orange, Texas
Players of American football from Texas
American football cornerbacks
Oklahoma State Cowboys football players
Houston Oilers players
Kansas City Chiefs players
Los Angeles Raiders players